Sports Club Dunajec Nowy Sącz - Five Polish League football club, Nowy Sącz.

About the club 
 Founded: 24 March 1945
 Address: Kosciuszko 1, 33-300 Nowy Sącz
 President: Andrew Danek
 Coaches: Christopher Szczepanski, Jacek Ruchała Janusz Piotrowski, Piotr Cream
 Stadium: 1000 seats capacity
 Colours: green-white

Achievements 
The biggest success was the participation in the canyon third division league. The club played players like Aleksander Klak, Peter Świerczewski Andrew Dorula. Dunajec Sports Club leads a successful soccer academy run by very good players once m.in Tadeusz She told Peter and Krzysztof Szczepanski Cream. The biggest successes are captured by the charges Peter Cream, twice wicemistrzostwa Senior Junior League of Little Poland.

History 
The club's activities during the many name changes.
 March 24, 1945 - the founding meeting was held in the Workers' Sports Club "Dawn". President was Boleslaw Kosecki. Base for activities constituted "Jordanówka" and established the club since 1954 the building was "Falcon".
 1946 - was the club president Joseph Schumacher, president and honorary mayor Joseph Łabuz.
 1949 - "Dawn" was transformed into the Athletic Field Circle "Spójnia," the president Adam Szczepanek.
 1955 - "Spójnia" merged with the Military Sports Club "Podhale" and the Sports Club was "Sparta", Zdzislaw Młyńca elected president.
 1957 - renamed KS "Sparta - Dunajec," the president Charles Ziobro.
 1959 - renamed the Military - Civilian Sports Club "Dunajec".
 The next club presidents were: Stanislaw Gądek (1959–1960), Maj. Julian Strecker (1960–1961), Colonel Stanislav Whiskers (1961–1978), Joseph Biernat (1978–1989), Richard Gurbowicz (1989–94).
 From 1995 to the present club is called KS "Dunajec", was chosen president of Kinga Olchawa (1995–97), and the next club presidents were James Potoczek (1997–99) and Andrew Danek (1999).

External links 
 The official website of the club Dunajec

Football clubs in Nowy Sącz
Association football clubs established in 1945
1945 establishments in Poland